Sylvester Kyner Jr. (December 17, 1932 – March 20, 1981), known as Sonny Red, was an American jazz alto saxophonist and composer associated with the hard bop idiom among other styles.

Sonny Red played with Art Blakey, Curtis Fuller, Paul Quinichette, Donald Byrd, Grant Green, Blue Mitchell, Wynton Kelly, Billy Higgins, and Cedar Walton.

Biography 
In the late 1940s, when he was still in his teens, Sonny Red began to play professionally in Detroit with Barry Harris. He continued to play with Barry Harris until 1952. He went on to play with Art Blakey in 1954, and in 1957 recorded with Curtis Fuller on three albums.

Sonny Red first came on the greater jazz scene in the late 1950s with Art Pepper in the album Two Altos.

He made two albums as a leader in 1961; both were released by Jazzland Recordings, a subsidiary of Riverside Records. He continued to record in the 1960s, including four albums with Donald Byrd in 1967.

By the 1970s, however, Sonny Red was falling into obscurity. He died in March 1981, at the age of 48.

Discography

As leader 
 1957: Two Altos (Regent) with Art Pepper
 1959–60: Out of the Blue (Blue Note) 
 1960: Breezing (Jazzland) 
 1961: A Story Tale (Jazzland) with Clifford Jordan
 1961: The Mode (Jazzland) with Grant Green and Barry Harris 
 1962: Images (Jazzland) with Grant Green and Barry Harris
 1971: Sonny Red (Mainstream)

As sideman
With Donald Byrd
 Mustang! (Blue Note, 1966)
 Blackjack (Blue Note, 1967)
 Slow Drag (Blue Note, 1967)
 The Creeper (Blue Note, 1967)
With Curtis Fuller
 New Trombone (Prestige, 1957)
 Curtis Fuller with Red Garland (New Jazz, 1957)
 Jazz ...It's Magic! (Regent, 1957)
With Bill Hardman
 Saying Something (Savoy, 1961)
With Yusef Lateef
 The Blue Yusef Lateef (Atlantic, 1968)
With Pony Poindexter
 Pony's Express (Epic, 1962)
With Paul Quinichette
 On the Sunny Side (Prestige, 1957)
With Bobby Timmons
 Live at the Connecticut Jazz Party (Early Bird Records, 1964)
With Frank Wess
 Jazz Is Busting Out All Over (1957)

References

1932 births
1981 deaths
Musicians from Detroit
American jazz alto saxophonists
American male saxophonists
Hard bop saxophonists
Blue Note Records artists
Mainstream Records artists
Savoy Records artists
Bebop saxophonists
20th-century American saxophonists
Jazz musicians from Michigan
20th-century American male musicians
American male jazz musicians